Alexandra Sviridova (alternate spellings: Alexandra Sviridov, Aleksandra Sviridov, and Aleksandra Sviridova) is a writer, journalist and filmmaker from Moscow, Russia. Her great-grandfather was the famous Rabbi Finkelstein of Czarist Russia.

Biography 
Alexandra Sviridova was born in the Soviet city Kherson.
In 1993 she immigrated from the post Soviet Russia to America, with her son Lev Sviridov (who later won a Rhodes Scholarship while a student at the City College of New York). She wrote scenarios for about 20 films and wrote over 500 essays.

Prior to leaving Russia, she wrote the scenario and co-directed (with Andrey Yerastov) the Russian language film "Varlam Shalamov. Several of My Lives" ("Варлам Шаламов. Несколько моих жизней" ) (1991) about Varlam Shalamov, an author of a collection of short stories about his experience in Gulag labor camps.

In 1986 she wrote the screenplay for a short animated film called "One Doll's Story" "История одной куклы" directed by Boris Ablymin about the Auschwitz Nazi concentration camp. It received the "Silver Dragon", major award of XXII Kraków International Film Festival. "Using stop-action animation, this inspiring film is one of the most engaging films ever made about the Holocaust"
Patricia Kowal, Los Angeles View, 1996.

She also produced Twelve one-hour shows for Russian television called "Top Secret". They dealt with such topics as Boris Pasternak's personal letters and manuscripts that were held by the KGB for thirty years, the Central Committee's secret files on the 1986 Chernobyl disaster, and former KGB agents who were serving as President Yeltsin's advisers or were lodged in other high positions. Twelve documentaries were on the top of the rating charts when they were shown during the period between March 1992 and April 1993.

For several years she worked for Survivors of the SHOAH Visual History Foundation, Founder and Chair: Steven Spielberg. She left in protest when it departed from the initially set goal: to record testimonies of all of the remaining survivors of the Holocaust (the work was stopped after collecting about 55,000 interviews, with 25,000 letters with apologies sent to people left unrecorded ).

She and other journalists claimed that while in the United States, they were not free to write truly independently. As an example she said her interviews with human rights activists, such as Yelena Bonner, were censored.

Private life 
She lives in New York.
Her son is Lev Sviridov, born 1982.

Filmography 
 1982  "V nebe 'Nochnye vedmy' "
 1985 "Chudo-derevo"
 1986  "One Doll's Story"
 1989 "Malchik i lyagushonok"
 1991 "Ispoved soderzhanki"
 1991 "Varlam Shalamov. Several of My Lives"

Books 
 1985 "Мои метаморфозы»
 1987 "Свиток»
 2009 "Вдох рыбы на горе»

Prizes and awards 
 2009 Mark Aldanov award

References

Additional references 
Karen W. Arenson (22 November 2004), "In a First, 2 of Nation's New Rhodes Scholars Come From CUNY", The New York Times, Section B, Page 1, Column 2. "His mother, Alexandra Sviridov, was a journalist and filmmaker in Moscow..."
Novaya Gazeta

 2001 Florida Rus Interview

External links
Sviridova in Magazines.russ.ru
Sviridova 2009: "Вдох рыбы на горе"
Sviridova 2011: "Человеческое мясо и боль"
Sviridova in NEWSWE ("МЫ ЗДЕСЬ")
Медитация на фоне погасшего экрана
Producing "Varlam Shalamov: Several of My Lives"
Film "Varlam Shalamov. My Several Lives" (1991)

Russian journalists
American women journalists
American people of Russian descent
Living people
1951 births
Russian screenwriters
Russian women writers
Gerasimov Institute of Cinematography alumni
21st-century American women